Lenke Rothman-Arnér (28 March 1929 in Kiskunfélegyháza, Hungary – 27 November 2008 in Lidingö, Sweden) was a Swedish artist, painter, and writer. Her works were exhibited at the Malmö Konsthall in 1989, the Göteborgs Konsthall in 1990, the Gothenburg Museum of Art in 1995, the Dunker Culture House in 2008, and the Sörmland Museum in 2018. Her works are a part of the collections of the Museum of Modern Art today.

Publications

References 

1929 births
2008 deaths
Hungarian emigrants to Sweden
Swedish artists
Swedish painters
Swedish writers